Metallica is an American heavy metal band, founded in 1981 by drummer Lars Ulrich and rhythm guitarist James Hetfield. Aside from Ulrich, the original lineup for some of the 1982 concerts included James Hetfield (rhythm guitar and lead vocals), Dave Mustaine (lead guitar and backing vocals) and Ron McGovney (bass guitar). Cliff Burton replaced McGovney in 1982 and played with the band until his death in 1986. After his death, bassists Jason Newsted (1986–2001), and Robert Trujillo (since 2003) were recruited in the band. The lead guitarist role was taken by Kirk Hammett (since 1983) after Dave Mustaine was fired from the band, who would then go on to form the band Megadeth. During the first years Metallica played in small festivals and as supporting acts on tours for bands such as Venom. Since their first live gig at Radio City, Anaheim on March 14, 1982, Metallica has performed on all seven continents numbering live events every year (with the exception of 2001) in a total of over 1,600 shows. The majority of these were played in the United States, but numerous concerts were also played in Canada, the United Kingdom, and Germany, among other countries. The band also went on seven worldwide tours: Damage, Inc. Tour (1986–1987), Damaged Justice (1988–1989), Wherever We May Roam Tour (1991–1992), Nowhere Else to Roam (1993), Madly in Anger with the World Tour (2003–2004), Escape from the Studio '06, and World Magnetic Tour (2008–2010). During these tours, South Africa as well as several countries in Central and South America, Asia, and Oceania were visited.

Metallica has played many shows at major rock festivals such as Woodstock '94, Ozzfest, Monsters of Rock, Lollapalooza, Download Festival, Reading Festival, and Days on the Green. They also held numerous concerts in stadiums, some of which featured crowds of over 100,000 people. One of the highest-attendance music concerts in history was held by AC/DC on September 28, 1991, at Tushino Airfield in Moscow, where unofficially 1.6 million people attended. Some of these performances were later released as videos for special box set or DVD releases. Some performances have been held in theaters, including two April 1999 shows alongside the San Francisco Symphony that were released as the album S&M.

Metallica's first official tour was Kill 'Em All for One, which started in 1983 to promote their debut album. Their longest so far have been the Wherever We May Roam and World Magnetic Tours, which lasted 14 months and 20 months, respectively, with each having over 170 concerts. The band is among the most lucrative live bands, selling out half of their first 187 concerts held during the 2000s, and gaining an attendance of over 3.5 million people and a gross of over US$227 million.

1980s tours

1990s tours

2000s tours

2010s tours

2020s tours

First and other performance

Notes

References
General

Specific

External links
Metallica on tour (subscription required)

 
Metallica